The 1948–49 Kategoria e Dytë was to be the sixth season of the second tier of football in Albania. The league began on 3 October 1948 but it was annulled on 31 March 1949 meaning there was no winner. On 3 October 1948 the Albanian Football Association relaunched the top two tiers using a western format where the season was to run between fall and spring, but on 31 March 1949 the championships were annulled following Soviet pressure.

League table

References

Kategoria e Parë seasons
Albania
2
2